General elections were held in Japan on 31 October 2021, as required by the constitution. Voting took place in all constituencies in order to elect members to the House of Representatives, the lower house of the National Diet. As the constitution requires the cabinet to resign in the first Diet session after a general election, the elections will also lead to a new election for Prime Minister in the Diet, and the appointment of a new cabinet, although ministers may be re-appointed. The election was the first general election of the Reiwa era.

The election followed a tumultuous period in Japanese politics which saw the sudden resignation of Prime Minister Shinzo Abe in 2020 due to health issues and the short premiership of his successor Yoshihide Suga, who stepped down as leader of the ruling Liberal Democratic Party (LDP) after only about a year in office due to poor approval ratings. The period since the previous general election in 2017 also saw the consolidation of much of the country's centre-left into a newly strengthened Constitutional Democratic Party (CDP) and the forming of the left-wing populist party Reiwa Shinsengumi led by former actor Taro Yamamoto.

The LDP, led by new Prime Minister Fumio Kishida, maintained a comfortable majority despite losing seats. The primary two left-wing opposition parties, the CDP and the Japanese Communist Party, both underperformed expectations and lost seats relative to their standings in the chamber immediately before the election. The CDP's poor results led to the resignation of party leader Yukio Edano shortly after the election. The Osaka-based conservative party Ishin no Kai gained 30 seats, becoming the third-largest party in the chamber.

Background
Following the 2017 general election, the Liberal Democratic Party (LDP) continued to find itself in a dominant position as Prime Minister Shinzo Abe led the party to a third consecutive victory, the first for a single Prime Minister since 1953. While the LDP's strong showing seemed to suggest momentum for Abe's long-held goal of revising the anti-war Article 9 of the Constitution, the prospect for revision was thwarted due to procedural obstacles in the Diet from opposition parties and the ruling coalition losing its two-thirds majority in the House of Councillors in the 2019 election.

Resignation of Shinzo Abe and election of Yoshihide Suga
Abe's approval ratings suffered in 2018 as several favoritism scandals dominated media coverage, however he was still re-elected as President of the LDP in September 2018 and became the longest-serving Prime Minister in Japanese history on 19 November 2019 and the longest-serving consecutive Prime Minister on 24 August 2020. However, Abe shocked observers when he announced on 28 August 2020 that he would resign the premiership due to a sudden resurgence of his ulcerative colitis. Chief Cabinet Secretary Yoshihide Suga was elected the next President of the LDP in September 2020 and succeeded Abe as Prime Minister days later.

Opposition party consolidation
Meanwhile, Japan's many opposition parties remained fractured and disunited. The Constitutional Democratic Party, seeking to establish itself as the primary centre-left opposition party against the LDP, merged with majorities of the Democratic Party for the People and the Social Democratic Party as well as several independent lawmakers in late 2020, officially re-organizing as a new party while retaining the same name and Yukio Edano as leader. Tokyo Governor Yuriko Koike's national party Kibō no Tō was dissolved in May 2018 after it merged with the Democratic Party to form the Democratic Party for the People, while Koike herself was re-elected in a landslide in 2020 as an independent. The period since 2017 also saw the creation of Reiwa Shinsengumi, a left-wing populist party formed by former actor Taro Yamamoto, whose central policy position is abolition of the consumption tax.

Suga's popularity falls and cabinet failure
While beginning office relatively popular, Prime Minister Suga's approval ratings gradually worsened due to public dissatisfaction over his handling of the COVID-19 pandemic, including Japan's slow vaccine rollout compared to the rest of the developed world, and his management of the delayed 2020 Tokyo Olympic Games. The LDP lost three Diet by-elections in April 2021 and also failed to win an outright majority in the Tokyo Metropolitan Assembly election in July despite winning the most seats. Analysts attributed the losses to Suga's low approval ratings.

Tokyo 2020 Summer Olympics and COVID-19 surge
When the Olympics were eventually held in July to August 2021, public sentiment rose as Japanese athletes secured a record haul of Olympic medals. However, this did not translate into an upturn in Suga's personal ratings as the event coincided with a state of emergency while COVID-19 cases in Japan continued to surge from the Delta variant. By the time the Tokyo Olympics ended, the country experienced more than a million cases. In an Asahi Shimbun poll taken at the end of the Olympics, the Cabinet's approval ratings fell to an all-time low of 28%, even though 56% of the public agreed that hosting the Olympics was the right decision signifying concern over the government's inability to handle the COVID-19 pandemic. As a result, the government's pandemic response is likely to be one of the election issues.

Although Suga claimed there is no evidence that the Olympics contributed to a surge in daily cases in Tokyo and other parts of Japan, experts, including the government's chief medical adviser believe the Games undermined official messaging on virus rules and encouraged people to become complacent.

2021 LDP leadership election and resignation of Suga

Following the Olympics, speculation rose that several LDP lawmakers, such as former ministers Sanae Takaichi, Seiko Noda, 2020 leadership candidate Fumio Kishida and party policy chief Hakubun Shimomura were preparing to run for the LDP leadership against Suga when his term as party president ends in September, in the lead up to the election. The defeat of candidate Hachiro Okonogi, who is Suga's associate, in the Yokohama mayoral election on 22 August added pressure on the prime minister and increased speculation about his political future.

On 3 September, Suga announced that he would not run for re-election for the LDP leadership citing low approval ratings, paving the way for a new LDP leader and Prime Minister to take the party into the general election. On 29 September, former foreign minister and centrist candidate Fumio Kishida defeated three other candidates and became the new leader of the LDP. He was elected by the Diet as the 100th Prime Minister of Japan on 4 October.

Opposition forms common policy platform
On 8 September, the Constitutional Democratic Party (CDP), Social Democratic Party (SDP), Japanese Communist Party (JCP) and Reiwa Shinsengumi formed a joint policy platform and an anti-LDP civil coalition for the upcoming election. The platform covered six areas: constitutionalism, measures to tackle the coronavirus pandemic, reducing economic disparities, transitioning to a decarbonized society, gender equality and government transparency. Policies in the platform included:
Opposition to constitutional revision proposed by the LDP that would expand government powers
Cuts in consumption tax rate and increasing tax burden on the wealthy
Shutting down nuclear power plants and opposition for a planned integrated resort and casino development proposals
New inquiries into a series of political scandals involving the LDP, including scandals of former Prime Ministers Shinzo Abe and Yoshihide Suga

As part of the agreement, members of the 4 parties involved withdrew from running in several of the single-seat constituencies to avoid vote splitting. The Japanese Communist Party withdrew 22 candidates in total, with only 106 candidates running for the JCP in total. This number was the lowest amount of candidates fielded by the JCP since the first election following Japan's electoral reform in 1996. Taro Yamamoto from Reiwa Shinsengumi withdrew from his race in the single member Tokyo 8th district for the CDP's Harumi Yoshida, choosing instead to run in the Tokyo PR block. Reiwa Shinsengumi withdrew 7 candidates to avoid vote splitting amongst the opposition, accounting for 40% of its planned slate of candidates.

Formation, then withdrawal of First no Kai
On 4 October, the regional Tokyo-based political party Tomin First no Kai announced that it had created a new national party called First no Kai. The party said that it planned to enter candidates for single-seat constituencies in Tokyo, and said that while current Governor of Tokyo Yuriko Koike will not be running, she will cooperate with the party. First no Kai will be led by Chiharu Araki, a member of the Tokyo Metropolitan Assembly who is also leader of Tomin First no Kai.

However, on 15 October, the party said they would not be fielding any candidates for the election and would concentrate on the next election instead. Analysts believed that Kishida's bringing forward of the election gave little time for recruitment of candidates, thus leading to the decision to sit out this election.

Election date
Under the post-occupation interpretation of Article 7 of the Constitution, the cabinet may instruct the Emperor to dissolve the House of Representatives for a snap election. Elections must be held within 40 days after dissolution. The only time since the Second World War that the House of Representatives was not dissolved before the end of its term was in 1976. If the House of Representatives completes a full four-year term, the election must be held within 30 days before that, unless the Diet is invoked, in session or about to be closed at the time. The previous House of Representatives' term ended on 21 October.

An extraordinary session of the National Diet was necessary in early October to elect the new prime minister. Depending on when that Diet session closed and if and when the new cabinet dissolved the House of Representatives, possible election dates ranged from late October to 14 November without dissolution or up to 28 November with dissolution. Since the election was held in late October, the 2021 election was the first in post-war history to be held not only at, but after the actual end of term (21 October). 

On 4 October, the newly elected prime minister Fumio Kishida scheduled the election for 31 October, with dissolution of the House of Representatives on 14 October, the final day of the extraordinary Diet session and campaigning set to begin on 19 October.

Previous considerations
With the resignation of Shinzo Abe in 2020 from his position as prime minister due to health issues, speculation rose of the possibility that a snap election would be held before the end of the full term, but this in fact did not happen.

Before the resignation announcement of Yoshihide Suga in 2021, the government did consider a plan to hold a general election on 17 October, several days before the expiration of the four-year term for House of Representatives members, government sources said on 30 August.

Political parties

Party manifestos

Liberal Democratic Party
The LDP manifesto, titled "Create a new era together with you" was released on 12 October and included:
Wealth redistribution to revive the Japanese economy and empowering the middle class
Tax breaks for corporations willing to raise wages
Advance administrative reforms to facilitate digitalization
Massive investment in science and technology, and funds for university research
Secure robust supply chains for critical materials, such as rare earths
Electronic COVID-19 vaccine passports
Continued development of nuclear fusion power generation, and expansion of renewable energy to achieve carbon neutrality by 2050
Expanding support for small and medium businesses hit by the COVID-19 pandemic 
Offer subsidies for enterprises if they move into new industries
Constitutional amendment including the proposed Japanese constitutional referendum to specifically mentioning the Self-Defense Forces in Article 9 of the Constitution and establishing a provision granting the Cabinet stronger powers in an emergency
Raising Japan's defense budget “above two percent” of gross domestic product (GDP) and enhancing Japan's defense capabilities
Support Taiwan's bid to join the CPTPP agreement and WHO observer status
Promoting further nuclear disarmament and nuclear nonproliferation

Observers commented that Prime Minister Kishida's promises during his LDP leadership campaign were missing from the manifesto, and the manifesto was heavily influenced by LDP's conservative figures like Sanae Takaichi, Akira Amari and ex-prime minister Shinzo Abe.

Constitutional Democratic Party
On 13 October, the CDPJ added into its manifesto: 
Allowing couples to adopt different surnames
Equality laws for LGBTQ people
Laws recognising same-sex marriage
Supplementary budget worth more than ¥30 trillion and cash handouts of ¥120,000 to low-income individuals
Temporary cuts in consumption tax rate from 10% to 5%
Changing the corporate tax into a progressive system
Raising the ceiling for income tax on rich individual
Raise capital gains tax to 25% by 2023 in principle and eventually to 30%
Realizing carbon neutrality without relying on nuclear power, and 100% renewable energy by 2050
Expanding public support for housing, education, health care, nurseries and elderly care
Better conditions for medical professionals by a ￥200,000 salary bonus, increasing staff at public health centers and expanding PCR testing
Revision to the U.S.–Japan Status of Forces Agreement
Halt construction work related to the relocation of Marine Corps Air Station Futenma in Okinawa
Enter Japan into Treaty on the Prohibition of Nuclear Weapons as an observer

Komeito
Komeito policies included:
Enter Japan into Treaty on the Prohibition of Nuclear Weapons as an observer
Expanded subsidies to raise the wages of employees working at small businesses
Resume the Go To Travel domestic tourism stimulus program
No building of new nuclear power plants and decarbonization through thermal power
Allowing couples to adopt different surnames

Japanese Communist Party
On 12 October, the JCP announced its manifesto, including the following proposals: 
Cash handouts of ¥100,000 to middle-income households
Raise the minimum wage, currently averaging at ¥930, to ¥1,500 per hour
Lower the consumption tax to 5%
Increase the existing government target of 46% cuts in carbon emissions by fiscal year 2030, to 50% and 60%

Nippon Ishin no Kai
The Nippon Ishin no Kai manifesto featured pledges including:
Reform of social insurance and pension system, with the introduction of a universal basic income of ¥60,000 per month, with additional supplements for non-coupled elderly
Reform of income tax and social insurance fee, replacing the current system with a two-tiered income tax
Deregulation of the workforce, allowing for compensated dismissals
Reform of the social medical insurance system from age-based subsidy rates to income-based cost subsidies
Universal access to free education from preschool to university, written within the constitution
Introduction of the "2:1 rule", requiring two pieces of regulation to be removed per introduction of any new industrial regulation
Deregulation of protected industries such as ridesharing, finance and agriculture
Separate surnames for married couples
Same-sex marriage legalisation
Maintaining current emission reduction targets with consideration of carbon pricing schemes
Legislating Osaka as the vice-capital of Japan
Push for further devolution with merger of prefectures into states (dōshūsei), while allocating the consumption tax as a regional tax
Constitutional amendments including: Universal free education, devolution, and the establishment of constitutional courts
Maintaining agnate succession of the Imperial throne while considering re-royalisation of former Imperial household members.
Repealing the 1%GDP cap on defence spending and the establishment of a national intelligence organisation
Promotion of free trade, especially within the Asia-pacific region
Add hospital capacity for COVID-19 treatment 
Temporary cuts in consumption tax rate from 10% to 5%, with tax rates set to 8% after two years
30% reduction in diet members, and a 30% cut in member's compensation
Contributions reform prohibiting corporate and organisational donations to political parties and candidates
Establishment of a public documents bureau, digitalisation of all public document, and maintaining edit records through utilisation of blockchain technology

Opinion polls

Candidates

Results

Many polls had predicted a weakened LDP or even a complete loss of government control in the elections, with one poll by The Japan Times suggesting the party would lose around 40 seats. Though the LDP did lose 25 seats compared to the previous elections, they comfortably maintained their single-party majority in the Diet.

The opposition coalition of CDP, JCP, SDP, and 	Reiwa Shinsengumi failed to increase its seat share, suffering a net loss of thirteen seats compared to the outgoing parliament. The CDP itself remained the largest opposition party, finishing second with 96 seats; although this marked an increase on the 55 seats won by the original CDP in the 2017 elections, the party had held 109 seats going into the elections following the merger with the Democratic Party for the People. The JCP lost two seats going from 12 to 10, the SDP kept it's one constituency seat in Okinawa, and Reiwa Shinsengumi increased its seats from one prior to the election to three.

The Osaka-based Nippon Ishin no Kai saw a strong third-place finish with 41 seats, a net gain of 30. The party won all seats in Osaka prefecture, except for four where they did not stand a candidate. The party also finished first in the Kinki Proportional Block.

By prefecture

By PR block

Representatives

Members of House of Representatives elected from single-seat constituency

By-election

Members of House of Representatives elected from proportional representation block

People who were elected in PR following the resignation of another member of the House of Representatives

Independent politician

Reactions
The results were disappointing for Japan's left-wing opposition parties, who had sought to capitalize on the high disapproval ratings of LDP administrations in 2020–2021. The two largest opposition parties, the CDP and the JCP, both lost seats compared to the outgoing parliament, despite their unified candidate agreement and joint policy platform. CDP leader Yukio Edano announced two days after the election that he would resign as leader following the party's performance, triggering a leadership election.

The right-wing populist Nippon Ishin no Kai gained 30 seats, receiving strong support in its home region of Osaka. Ishin no Kai became the third-largest party in the chamber, which was seen by observers as a sign of voter dissatisfaction with both the ruling coalition and traditional opposition parties.

See also
Proposed Japanese constitutional referendum

Notes

Further reading

 Pekkanen, Robert J.; Reed, Steven R.; Smith, Daniel M. (eds.). 2022. Japan Decides 2021: The Japanese General Election. Springer.

References

External links

General elections in Japan
Japan
General
General